The Volkswagen Group MEB platform ('modular electric-drive toolkit') is a modular car platform for electric cars developed by the Volkswagen Group and its subsidiaries. It is used in models of Audi, SEAT, Škoda and Volkswagen. The architecture is aimed to "consolidate electronic controls and reduce the number of microprocessors, advance the application of new driver-assistance technology and somewhat alter the way cars are built" by the VW Group.

Plans 
The MEB platform is part of a Volkswagen strategy to start production of new battery electric vehicles between 2019 and 2025. In 2017, the VW Group announced a gradual transition from combustion engine to battery electric vehicles with all 300 models across 12 brands having an electric version by 2030.

As of May 2018, the VW Group had committed  in electric-vehicle batteries supplies and announced plans to outfit 16 factories to build electric cars by the end of 2022. The Volkswagen-branded production cars started to be assembled in VW's Zwickau plant in Germany for the European market at the end of 2019, while two plants in North America and China started production in 2020 and Chattanooga, Tennessee in 2022. The Škoda-branded SUV Vision E is produced in the Škoda plant in Mladá Boleslav, Czech Republic, along with electric motors and electric car batteries.

, two types of the MEB platform were slated to be developed: one for passenger vehicles and one for utility automobiles that accommodate heavier cargo. VW also stated that the platform would be available for procurement to competitor manufacturers.

Ford Motor Company has a strategic partnership with Volkswagen for the MEB platform to benefit from economies of scale. Ford plans to build MEB cars by 2023.

Applications

Production vehicles 
Audi Q4 e-tron (2021–present)
Audi Q4 Sportback e-tron (2021–present)
Audi Q5 e-tron (2021–present)
Cupra Born (2021–present)
Škoda Enyaq iV (2020–present)
Škoda Enyaq Coupé iV (2021–present)
Volkswagen ID.3 (2019–present)
Volkswagen ID.4 (2020–present)
Volkswagen ID.5 (2021–present)
Volkswagen ID.6 (2021–present)
Volkswagen ID. Buzz (2022–present)
Volkswagen ID. Buzz Cargo (2022–present)

Concept vehicles 
Cupra UrbanRebel
Cupra Tavascan
Volkswagen ID. Aero/ID. 7
Volkswagen ID. Vizzion
Volkswagen ID. Buggy
 Volkswagen ID. Space Vizzion
Volkswagen ID. Life
Volkswagen ID. 2all

Electric motor

APP 310 
The MEB platform is supported by the APP 310 electric motor, which is a permanent magnet brushless motor. Maximum torque is achieved at a low engine speed, which means that a 1-speed gearbox is sufficient for the entire rotational speed range.

The motor is produced at component sites in Kassel, Germany and Tianjin, China, while the rotor and stator are produced in Salzgitter, Germany. The two plants will produce up to 1.4 million electric motors each year from 2023 onwards.

See also 
 Volkswagen ID. series
 Volkswagen Group Premium Platform Electric – a similar platform for premium cars
 Volkswagen Group Scalable Systems Platform – a similar platform to be introduced from 2026
 List of Volkswagen Group platforms
 Hyundai E-GMP – a similar multi-vehicle electric platform

References

External links
Volkswagen Group corporate website

Electric vehicle platforms
MEB platform